is a private junior college, located in the city  of Akita, Japan. The school is affiliated with the Roman Catholic Church.

History
The School of the Holy Spirit was opened by the Missionary Sisters Servants of the Holy Spirit from the Netherlands in Akita City in 1908. It was officially chartered as a junior college in 1954.

Organization
 School of Home Economics
Department of Nutrition
Department of Nursery Education

External links
 Seirei Women's Junior College

Educational institutions established in 1954
Private universities and colleges in Japan
Japanese junior colleges
Universities and colleges in Akita Prefecture
1954 establishments in Japan
Women's universities and colleges in Japan
Catholic universities and colleges in Japan
Buildings and structures in Akita (city)